I'll Sell My Skin Dearly is a 1968 Italian Spaghetti Western film  directed by Ettore Maria Fizzarotti.

Cast 
 Mike Marshall as Shane
 Michèle Girardon as  Georgina Bennett
  Valerio Bartoleschi as  Kristian
  Dane Savours as Ralph Magdalena
  Spartaco Conversi as  Benson

References

External links

1968 films
Spaghetti Western films
1968 Western (genre) films
Films directed by Ettore Maria Fizzarotti
Titanus films
1960s Italian films